Accra Academy is a non-denominational day and boarding boys' school. It is located at Bubuashie near Kaneshie in the Greater Accra Region, Ghana. The school was established as a private secondary educational institution in 1931 and gained the status of a Government-Assisted School in 1950. It was the first private academy to be established in the Gold Coast, and is regarded as one of the foremost secondary educational institutions in Ghana.

The academy runs courses in business, general science, general arts, agricultural science and visual arts, leading to the award of a West African Senior School Certificate.

The academy's founders provided tuition to students who wanted a secondary-grade education but who did not have financial support to enable them do so. The first principal and co-founder, Kofi Konuah periodically travelled to some of the major towns in each region of the country to organize entrance examinations for students, so as to offer the brilliant but needy among them the opportunity of education in the Accra Academy. The academy no longer offers special admission to brilliant but needy students but, as per a 2005 general directive from the Ghana Education Service, admits its students through a school selection placement system.

Accra Academy was ranked 8th out of the top 100 best high schools in Africa by Africa Almanac in 2003, based upon quality of education, student engagement, strength and activities of alumni, school profile, internet and news visibility. Amongst its unique achievements include; being the first senior high school to have produced successive Chief Justices of Ghana, and the only school at the moment to have produced successive Ghanaian speakers of parliament. It is also the first school to have produced a head of state and a deputy head of state in the same government in Ghana.

History

The academy was founded by Messrs.Kofi George Konuah, Samuel Neils Awuletey, Gottfried Narku Alema and James Akwei Halm-Addo on July 20, 1931, at Mantse Agbonaa, a suburb of James Town in Accra.

Start in Ellen House
The academy's founders operated the school from a one-storey house that provided classrooms for the students. The facility was named Ellen House after its leaser, Ellen Buckle. Ellen was the widow of Vidal J. Buckle, a lawyer and Gold Coast elite, who built the property. The academy began work with a student enrolment of 19, distributed into Forms 1 through to 3. The founders of the academy together with M. F. Dei-Anang and S.S. Sackey comprised the pioneer teaching staff of the school.

Government-Assisted School status
In December 1932, the academy presented its first batch of ten students for the Junior Cambridge School Certificate Examination, seven out of whom passed the examination. In 1939, the academy presented 45 students for the Senior Cambridge School Certificate Examination, out of whom 42 students passed, with 10 students obtaining exemption from the London Matriculation Examination.

In 1947, a recommendation was made to the director of education to grant the academy the status of a Government Assisted School. The recommendation was approved and the academy begun operating as a Government Assisted school from 1 January 1950.

Relocating to Bubuashie

The academy operated as a day-school till it began accommodating students in Claremont House in 1935, a single-storey building adjoining Ellen House, also a property of Vidal J. Buckle and leased by his widow Ellen. Accommodation was limited and therefore was only offered to students in special circumstances. Due to a steady increase in the number of applicants applying for enrolment in the academy, the academy's administrators began preparations to relocate the academy to a larger and permanent site. The initial site that was acquired to relocate the school was situated at Kokomlemle; however, this site had to be abandoned as a result of a prolonged litigation concerning the ownership of the land. A second site, which was located at Korle Gonno, was also given up because of its remote location.

The search for a new school site ended in 1956 when J.A. Halm-Addo succeeded in lobbying the Convention People's Party government to relocate and expand the academy as part of its accelerated development plan. Owing to his efforts, the academy was offered a 37-acre plot of land at Bubuashie, off the Winneba Road.

J. Monta & Sons was awarded the contract to develop the new school site in October 1959, however actual work on the site began in December of the same year and by July 1961, J. Monta & Sons presented the newly developed school site to the school administrators for the celebration of the academy's thirtieth anniversary. In September of the same year, both staff and students relocated from Ellen House to the present site at Bubuashie. A ceremony to officially recognize the academy's relocation to Bubuashie was held in February 1962 and A. J. Dowuona-Hammond, then Minister of Education and coincidentally a past student of the school, declared the new school site opened.  
 
The academy acquired the nickname Little Legon shortly after the new school site was commissioned, when some students from the Western Region who had gained admission into the University of Ghana, reported at the academy instead of the University of Ghana, apparently confused by the close similarity between the infrastructure of both educational institutions.   
 
A dormitory block to serve as a residential facility for students was completed later in 1966.

Becoming a fully-fledged SSS
In 1981, the academy celebrated its golden jubilee with the status of a fully fledged senior secondary school with a student enrolment of 900 and a teaching staff of 52. In 1990, the Provisional National Defense Council permitted the academy to operate as a semi-autonomous educational institution, together with 10 other secondary schools upon acknowledgement by the Secretary of Education, K. B. Asante.

Insignia

Academics

Admission
Being a senior high school for boys, the academy offers admission to boys only. Gaining entry into the academy is competitive, and open to students who have completed Junior high school. Prior to writing their Basic Education Certificate Examination (BECE), final year Junior High School students, register for senior high school through a computerized school selection and placement system (CSSPS) which was introduced by the Ghana Education service in 2005.

Unlike in the previous grading system in which a candidate's overall academic performance in the Basic Education Certificate Examination was obtained by computing the aggregate on the candidate's best six subject scores, the raw scores obtained by a candidate in the Basic Education Certificate Examination determines the candidates overall academic performance in the exam under the computerized school selection and placement system. Because the computerized school selection and placement system uses a deferred-acceptance algorithm which ensures that  Junior high school applicants are admitted strictly based on academic merit, administrators of the academy use raw scores obtained in the Basic Education Certificate Examination to admit applicants from Junior High School.

Curriculum

The programmes run in the academy are: general arts, general science, agriculture, business and visual arts. As part of their computerized school selection and placement system registration, final year junior high school applicants select four elective courses. Unlike elective courses, core courses are offered to all students, irrespective of their programme of study. The academy's core courses are: English language, core mathematics, social studies, integrated science, ICT (core) and physical education, however, students are only examined both internally and externally as well, in the first five aforementioned courses.

The academy's curriculum like that of other senior high schools in Ghana, operates in a three-year academic cycle, from form one to form three. The beginning of the first academic year marks the enrolment of the student in the academy, while the ending of the third academic year marks the graduation of the student.

Academic performance
The academy maintains a high academic standard and has over the years been ranked among the best performing senior high schools in Ghana. In 2009, the academy was listed among six other schools in the Greater Accra Region, which had 60% or more of its candidates qualifying for tertiary education. In a survey, the academy was listed among secondary schools in Ghana that contribute 50% or more of its students to universities. 
  
In 2018, 676 students of the school sat the WASSCE. 640 students of this number passed in all 8 courses taken (i.e obtained grades between A1 to C6). This represented a percentage pass of 94.7% and percentage of students of qualified academic enrolment status into a university programme in Ghana. In 2020, 672 students of the school sat the WASSCE. 633 students of this number had passes in 6 courses (i.e 4 core courses and 2 elective courses). This represented a percentage pass of 94.2% in relation to passes in 6 courses.

Student life

Facilities

Halls of residence

The academy has eight halls of residence. The first four of these halls were inaugurated as part of the school's 1967 Annual Speech and Prize Giving Day activities. Among the four, three were later renamed after founding fathers of the school, with the exception of Kofi Konuah, while the fourth is named after Mrs. Ellen Buckle. They are as follows; Alema, Awuletey, Ellen, Halm Addo. The remaining four halls were inaugurated as part of the school's 83rd Founders' Day Celebration in 2014. They are named after the following prominent alumni; Nana Akuoko Sarpong, Rt. Hon. Peter Ala Adjetey, Nana Wereko Ampem II and Nana Awuah Darko Ampem.

Each hall is supervised by a hall-master while a senior hall-master serves as a liaison between all four halls of residence. Hall-prefects assist hall-masters in the performance of their official duties and have a general responsibility to maintain order in their halls.

Hall-masters are not resident in the halls they supervise but rather housed in staff bungalows on the school's premises, on the other hand, hall-prefects reside in the halls in which they exercise jurisdiction. Each hall of residence contains a bedroom, storage room, ironing room, prefects' cubicle and a washroom.

Each academic year, the administrators of the academy organize athletics competitions between the members of the four Halls of Residence as a way of building up rapport among students. These inter-Hall athletic competitions also serve as an avenue for the academy's sports trainers to select students with outstanding sports qualities who can represent the academy in external sports competitions.

Regulations and sanctions
The Accra Academy maintains strict rules on discipline. A student undertaking a mild punishment is asked to carry out cleaning, scrubbing, sweeping, weeding or disposing of refuse. A student who commits a grievous school offence is made to proceed on an indefinite suspension or is dismissed from the academy, a notable example of which is the dismissal of Chuckie Taylor, the son of the former president of Liberia, Charles Taylor, on grounds of possessing drugs and weapons.

Associations and clubs
Academy students are involved in Extracurricular activities through their membership in school associations and clubs, some of which include:

 Alzheimer's Foundation of America (Youth wing), 
Cadet Corp,  
Campus Ministry, 
Debaters Club,  
Drama Club, 
Geography Club,  
German Club,
Ghana United Nations Students and Youth Association (GUNSA).,  
Global Teenager Project (Ghana),   
Head of State Award Scheme,  
HIV/AIDS Kickers Youth club.,  
Investment Club,   
Junior Achievement Club,  
Pan-African Club,  
Robotics Club, 
Rotaract Club, 
Science Club,  
Scrabble Club,  
Scripture Union,  
Students Representation Council – S R C,  
Students World Assembly  
The Earth and Wildlife Club

Sports
As early as 1934, the academy's administrators hired a sports-master to organize the sporting activities of the academy. Students were trained in athletics, soccer, and hockey. The academy won the Aggrey Shield together with seven other trophies in the annual inter-college athletics competition held in 1950, and through which the academy became recognized in Ghanaian inter-college sports, while the words "Accra Aca, Bleoo" came to also serve as a slogan for the school.

Annual events
The academy's administrators and alumni association organize annual events for the students and alumni of the school, including a speech and prize-giving day ceremony, a memorial lecture and a Home-coming Reunion. The annual speech and prize-giving day ceremony award the school's best performing students. Occasionally retired as well as active teachers and staff of the academy are awarded for their contributions to the school. The Konuah-Halm-Addo-Awuletey-Alema Memorial Lectures (formerly Accra Academy Foundation Lectures) was instituted in 1991 by Vincent Freeman, then academy headmaster, as part of the school's 60th anniversary celebrations. Home-coming reunions are usually organised as part of the academy's anniversary celebrations. They are usually characterized by bonding activities that include the singing of popular school songs called Jamas and the playing of table tennis, football and snooker.

Headmasters

Old Boys Association
The association functions as an old boys network which is opened to any person who has been enrolled in the academy for more than one year.

The association has a governing body consisting of: a president, secretary, treasurer and a public relations officer elected at an annual general meeting for a fixed tenure of office. They form the executive committee of the association and have the responsibility of planning and executing all programmes or events that are organised by the association. The association is operated from a national secretariat, which doubles as the association's headquarters in Accra. It is located on the premises of the school and is responsible for coordinating the activities of all year groups and regional secretariats of the association. It also serves as a liaison between alumni and the school.

Notable alumni

 
Notable alumni of the Accra Academy are those old students who have excelled or played pioneering roles in their various fields of endeavour. The school has graduated many notable alumni, including a big six, a head of state, and a deputy head of state. Three speakers of parliament attended the school, as well as three Chief Justices of Ghana.

Politics   
 
 

In the field of politics, Ako Adjei, a member of the big six and Ghana's first minister for foreign affairs attended the school. Ghana's second head of state, J. A. Ankrah, and his deputy, J. W. K. Harlley were both old boys. The school has educated three speakers of parliament: Daniel Francis Annan, Peter Ala Adjetey, and Edward Doe Adjaho. In the Fourth Republic, three successive chairmen of a major political party, the New Patriotic Party, have been old boys (Peter Ala Adjetey, Samuel Odoi-Sykes, Harona Esseku). Harry Sawyerr, who is the only minister of the Third Republic to have again served as a minister in the Fourth Republic is an alumnus.  Paul Boateng, the first person of colour to be appointed a cabinet minister in a UK government, is also an alumnus of the school.

Law 

 
In law, Accra Academy alumni include Chief Justices Samuel Azu Crabbe, Fred Kwasi Apaloo, and Edward Kwame Wiredu. In all, nine (9) Supreme Court Justices have been educated at the school, including Justices Jones Dotse and Samuel Adibu Asiedu, both currently active justices of the Supreme Court of Ghana. Internationally, Walter Onnoghen was Chief Justice of Nigeria, Apaloo served as Chief Justice of Kenya, Azu Crabbe was Justice of the East African Court of Appeal and Frederick Bruce-Lyle was the longest serving judge of the Eastern Caribbean Supreme Court. Attorney-Generals who attended the school include the first Ghanaian Attorney General of Ghana, George Mills-Odoi; the first female Attorney General of Ghana, Betty Mould-Iddrisu; Nicholas Yaw Boafo Adade; and Gustav Koranteng-Addow. Prior to the merger of the Ministry of Justice with the Attorney General Department, Ako Adjei was Ghana's first Minister of Justice. The current Special Prosecutor of Ghana, Kissi Agyebeng, is an old boy.

Public Service 
   

In public service, Nathan Quao,  Gilbert Boahene and Ben C. Eghan are alumni who have been cabinet secretary. Nathan Quao remains an icon in the Ghana civil service for service to successive cabinets;  Joseph Bennet Odunton was the first black African to hold an appointment at Buckingham Palace; Edward Akufo Quist-Arcton was the first Ghanaian forestry head;  Harry Dodoo was the first Gold Coast indigene to lead the Ghana Cocoa Board; E. N. Omaboe was the first Ghanaian to be Government Statistician; and V. C. R. A. C. Crabbe established the first Electoral Commission. Four alumni have served as Chiefs of the Army Staff of the Ghana Armed Forces; this includes the first Ghanaian to take up the role, Joseph Arthur Ankrah, who later served as the Chief of Defence Staff. David Animle Hansen was the first Ghanaian to be appointed Chief of the Naval Staff, and J. W. K. Harlley became the first IGP since the title was officially used in 1966.

Royalty 
Monarchs who attended the school include the 34th Okyenhene and Paramount Chief of Akyem Abuakwa, Osagyefo Kuntunkununku II; Ohene of Amanokrom, Oyeeman Wereko Ampem II; Omanhene of Agogo Traditional Area, Nana Akuoko Sarpong; and the Omanhene of Winneba, Effutu Traditional Area, Neenyi Ghartey VII.

Academia  

The first black African Rhodes Scholar, Lebrecht Wilhem Fifi Hesse, was educated at the school. The chemist Frank Gibbs Torto was the first Ghanaian appointed lecturer of the University of Ghana (the oldest university in Ghana); and K. E. Senanu was acting vice-chancellor of University of Ghana for the 1983/84 academic year. Daniel Asua Wubah is the first African president of Millersville University of Pennsylvania. Alumni who have been directors of research institutes include, Edwin Asomaning; former director of Cocoa Research Institute of Ghana, and Peter Quartey, director of the Institute of Statistical, Social and Economic Research of the University of Ghana.

Medicine 
In medicine, alumni include the first Ghanaian neurosurgeon, J. F. O. Mustaffah; the first Ghanaian eye specialist, Cornelius Odarquaye Quarcoopome; and Jacob Amekor Blukoo-Allotey, who is known for his pioneering role in the study of pharmacology in Ghana. Cornelius Odarquaye Quarcoopome and Jacob Plange-Rhule were both once presidents of the Ghana Medical Association. Emmanuel Quaye Archampong was president of the West African College of Surgeons, and Joseph Kpakpo Acquaye was president of the West African College of Physicians.

Arts  

 
In the arts, Jerry Hansen founded and became the first president of the Musicians Union of Ghana (MUSIGA). Veteran music producer Zapp Mallet coined the term “hip life," and KiDi is the 2022 VGMA artist of the year. Actor Chris Attoh and writer Amu Djoleto also attended the school.

Business 
In business and entrepreneurship, Nana Awuah Darko Ampem I, widely regarded as the godfather of insurance in Ghana, is known to have founded Ghana's first private indigenous insurance company (Vanguard Assurance). T. E. Anin was managing director and chairman of the Ghana Commercial Bank, Tei Mante was vice-chairman of Ecobank Group, Daniel Addo is managing director of CBG and Julian Opuni is managing director of Fidelity Bank. Included in its list of business-persons  are E.N. Omaboe (also Nana Wereko Ampem II) and John Kobina Richardson who both served on a committee to initiate the Ghana Stock Exchange. Felix E. Addo is  chairman of Guinness Ghana Breweries.

Journalism 
In the media, Earl Ankrah is known to have pioneered breakfast shows in Ghana; Ben Ephson is a renowned pollster; founder and chief editor of the Daily Dispatch; and Nathan Adisi (Bola Ray) is CEO of EIB Network Group. Retired football commentator Joe Lartey ("over to you, Joe Lartey"), considered one of the greatest commentators in Africa, also studied at the school. Other media personalities include Goodwin Tutum Anim, who was the first Ghanaian to head Ghana News Agency; African Journalist of the Year Award winner Israel Laryea; Randy Abbey of Good Morning Ghana; and Akwasi Sarpong of the BBC.

Sports   

In sports, notable old boys include Ohene Djan, known to be Ghana's iconic sports administrator and first president of the G.F.A., and his successor, Henry Plange Nyemitei.  Asamoah Gyan, the Black Stars' former captain and all-time top scorer, and his teaammate Lee Addy attended the school. Randy Abbey and  Sammy Anim Addo currently serve on the Executive Council Committee of the G.F.A., and Prosper Harrison Addo is the General Secretary of the G.F.A. In athletics, A. K. Konuah managed Ghana's first appearances at the Olympics and Commonwealth games. John Myles-Mills and brother Leo Myles-Mills each competed on the track at two Olympic events. Also alumni N. A. Adjin-Tettey was the national athletics coach for several years. In boxing, alumni Alhassan Brimah competed in the sport at the Olympics and was the 1962 African Middleweight champion.

Ties

ACASMA (Accra Academy and St. Mary's Alliance)
ACASMA is the joint association of the old boys and girls of Accra Academy and the St. Mary's Senior Secondary School, now St. Mary's Senior High School.

There was a nationwide teachers strike in the 1970s and some Accra Academy students who were capable of learning the school curricula on their own offered lessons free of charge to their colleagues in Accra Academy and St. Mary's Senior Secondary School. The goodwill demonstrated by these students from the Accra Academy won the admiration of staff and students of the St. Mary's Senior Secondary School and resulted in the formation of the alliance to foster stronger ties between both secondary educational institutions.

Lodge Accra Academy
The Accra Academy Lodge is a Masonic lodge managed by alumni who are Freemasons in the Grand Lodge of Ghana or the Grand Lodge of Scotland. The lodge is not part of the school's administration and as such has its own management and premises. Membership in the lodge is open only to alumni. Members occasionally support the school with financial assistance.

See also

 Education in Ghana
 List of senior secondary schools in Ghana
In the News
Accra Academy 1980 Old Students Rehabilitate School's North Gate. Retrieved from modernghana.com.

References

External links

 School Website
 Alumni website-UK
 Alumni website-Ghana

 
1931 establishments in Gold Coast (British colony)
Boarding schools in Ghana
Boys' schools in Ghana
Educational institutions established in 1931
High schools in Ghana
Private schools in Africa
Schools in Accra